Grand Conspiracy is volume five of the Wars of Light and Shadow by Janny Wurts. It is also volume two of the Alliance of Light, the third story arc in the Wars of Light and Shadow.

External links
Grand Conspiracy Webpage
Grand Conspiracy Excerpt

1999 American novels
American fantasy novels
Wars of Light and Shadow
Alliance of Light
HarperCollins books